Verdamicin is an aminoglycoside antibiotic produced by Micromonospora grisea.

References 

Aminoglycoside antibiotics
Micromonosporaceae